Para Todos los Públicos is the eleventh studio album by Spanish hard rock band Extremoduro, released on 8 November 2013. It was produced by Iñaki "Uoho" Antón, The album's recording started at early 2012 and it was finished at spring of 2013. It was published by Warner Music on 8 November 2013. The first single "¡Qué Borde Era Mi Valle!" was released on 22 October 2013. The album release date was initially scheduled for 19 November 2013 but the album was illegally leaked.

Track listing
Lyrics written by Roberto Iniesta, music composed by Roberto Iniesta and Iñaki Antón.

Personnel 
Extremoduro
 Roberto "Robe" Iniesta – Vocals, guitar and backing vocals
 Iñaki "Uoho" Antón – Guitar, piano, keyboards and backing vocals
 Miguel Colino – Bass
 José Ignacio Cantera – Drums
Additional musicians
 María "Cebolleta" Martín – Backing vocals
 Gino Pavone –Percussion instrument
 Javier Mora – Piano and organ
 Ara Malikian – Violin
 Carmen Mª Elena González – Violin
 Humberto Armas – Viola
 Irene Etxebest – Violoncello
 Félix Landa – Backing vocals
 Agnes Lillith – Backing vocals
 Airam Etxaniz – Vocals on Poema Sobrecogido
 José Alberto Batiz – Second guitar solo on Pequeño Rocanrol Endémico

Charts

Weekly charts

Year-end charts

Certifications

Notes

External links 
 Extremoduro official website (in Spanish)

2013 albums
Extremoduro albums
Spanish-language albums